Arthur Peterson may refer to:

Arthur P. Peterson (1858–1895), Hawaiian politician
Arthur Frederick Peterson (1859–1922), English judge
Arthur Peterson (actor) (1912–1996), American character performer
Arthur V. Peterson (1912–2008), American military officer
Arthur L. Peterson (born 1926), American educator and politician
Arthur Peterson (Vermont politician), American legislator elected in 2020